Jill Barry (born November 12, 1973) is an American politician who is the member of the Connecticut House of Representatives from the 31st district in Hartford County.

Political career
Barry started her political career as a member of the Glastonbury Town Council, where she served from 2011 to 2018. She spearheaded the "tobacco free parks" program in Glastonbury, which passed in 2017.

Barry was elected in the general election to the Connecticut General Assembly on November 6, 2018, defeating Republican candidate Lillian Tanski. She was re-elected in 2020, defeating Stewart "Chip" Beckett.

Electoral history

References

Barry, Jill
21st-century American politicians
Living people
1973 births
People from Glastonbury, Connecticut